Pedro Virgilio Rocha Franchetti (3 December 1942 – 2 December 2013) was a Uruguayan footballer who played 52 games for the Uruguay national team between 1961 and 1974.

Biography
He is the only player to appear in four consecutive World Cups for the Uruguay national football team: 1962, 1966, 1970 and 1974. He also played in the Copa América in 1967.

At club level he played most of his career for Peñarol and São Paulo in Brazil.

During his time with Peñarol, the club won 8 Uruguayan league titles (1959–1962, 1964, 1965, 1967, 1968), three Copa Libertadores (1960, 1961,  1966) the Copa Intercontinental in 1961 and 1966 and two editions of the Uruguayan Copa Competencia in 1964 and 1967.

In 1970 Rocha joined São Paulo F.C. where he helped the team obtain the Campeonato Paulista in 1971 and 1975. He was the championship top scorer in 1972. In 1977, his final year with the club they became national champions for the first time in their history.

Later in his career he played for Coritiba where he won Campeonato Paranaense championship, Palmeiras and Bangu in Brazil. His last clubs were Deportivo Neza and Monterrey in Mexico in 1979 and 1980.

He coached Japan's J.League club Kyoto Purple Sanga in 1997.

He suffered from mesencephalic atrophy, a serious degenerative illness that affected his speech and his movements, paralyzing part of his body and confining him to a wheelchair. He died on 2 December 2013 in São Paulo, one day before completing 71 years.

Career statistics

International

Managerial statistics

Honours
Peñarol
Primera División: 1959, 1960, 1961, 1962, 1964, 1965, 1967, 1968
Copa Libertadores: 1960, 1961, 1966
Intercontinental Cup: 1961, 1966
Intercontinental Champions' Supercup: 1969

São Paulo
Campeonato Brasileiro Série A: 1977
Campeonato Paulista: 1971, 1975

References

External links

 

1942 births
2013 deaths
Footballers from Salto, Uruguay
Uruguayan footballers
Uruguayan expatriate footballers
Uruguay international footballers
1962 FIFA World Cup players
1966 FIFA World Cup players
1970 FIFA World Cup players
1974 FIFA World Cup players
Campeonato Brasileiro Série A players
1967 South American Championship players
Copa América-winning players
Copa Libertadores-winning players
Expatriate footballers in Brazil
Expatriate footballers in Mexico
Uruguayan football managers
Expatriate football managers in Portugal
Expatriate football managers in Japan
Peñarol players
São Paulo FC players
Sociedade Esportiva Palmeiras players
Coritiba Foot Ball Club players
Bangu Atlético Clube players
C.F. Monterrey players
Uruguayan Primera División players
Liga MX players
Associação Atlética Internacional (Limeira) managers
Esporte Clube Taubaté managers
Botafogo Futebol Clube (SP) managers
Coritiba Foot Ball Club managers
Guarani FC managers
Mogi Mirim Esporte Clube managers
Associação Portuguesa de Desportos managers
Sporting CP managers
Sport Club Internacional managers
Kyoto Sanga FC managers
Associação Atlética Ponte Preta managers
Ituano FC managers
Associação Atlética Caldense managers
Esporte Clube XV de Novembro (Piracicaba) managers
Campeonato Brasileiro Série A managers
J1 League managers
Primeira Liga managers
Association football forwards
Association football midfielders
Uruguayan expatriate football managers
Uruguayan expatriate sportspeople in Brazil
Uruguayan expatriate sportspeople in Japan
Uruguayan expatriate sportspeople in Portugal
Expatriate football managers in Brazil
Uruguayan expatriate sportspeople in Mexico
Ipatinga Futebol Clube managers